Peter Kingston (born July 14, 2001) is an American soccer player who plays college soccer for Seattle Redhawks.

Career
Kingston joined the Seattle Sounders FC academy in 2015.  He made his debut for USL club Seattle Sounders FC 2 in August 2018.

In 2020, Kingston attended Seattle University to play college soccer.

References

External links
 

2001 births
Living people
American soccer players
Association football midfielders
People from Kirkland, Washington
Seattle Redhawks men's soccer players
Soccer players from Washington (state)
Sportspeople from King County, Washington
Tacoma Defiance players
Ballard FC players
USL Championship players
USL League Two players